The following is a list of massacres that have occurred in Guyana (numbers may be approximate):

References 

Guyana
Massacres